Mettur taluk is a taluk of Salem district of the Indian state of Tamil Nadu. The headquarters of the taluk is the town of Mettur.

Demographics
According to the 2011 census, the taluk of Mettur had a population of 417,460 with 217,182  males and 200,278 females. There were 922 women for every 1000 men. The taluk had a literacy rate of 63.91. Child population in the age group below 6 was 19,653 Males and 17,652 Females.

References 

Taluks of Salem district